Italian singer Mina has released 157 official singles and 63 promotional singles.

Singles

1950s

1960s

1970s

1980s

1990s

2000s

2010s

2020s

See also
 Mina albums discography

References

External links
 
 
 

Discographies of Italian artists
Pop music discographies
Blues discographies
Rock music discographies
Rhythm and blues discographies